Gentlemen Are Born is a 1960 Italian historical comedy film directed by Mario Mattoli and starring Totò, Peppino De Filippo and Delia Scala.

Plot
Rome 1906: Baron Ottone Spinelli degli Ulivi, said Zaza, is a rich spendthrift who likes pretty girls. His brother Pio degli Ulivi is a miser tailor who hates Zazà because he is always in his house asking for money to pay off family debts. One day Zazà intends steal 300 lire to his brother, and makes him believe that he has a daughter to support.

Cast
 Totò as Ottone Degli Ulivi, also known as Zazà
 Peppino De Filippo as Pio Degli Ulivi, Ottone's brother
 Delia Scala as Patrizia
 Riccardo Garrone as Enzo, Patrizia's fiancé
 Lidia Martora as Maria Luisa, Pio's wife
 Luigi Pavese as Bernasconi
 Angela Luce as Fedele, Pio's maid
 Dori Dorika as Adelina Maniglia
 Nico Pepe as Binotti
 Liana Orfei as Titì
 Carlo Croccolo as Battista, Ottone's butler

References

Bibliography
 Aprà, Adriano. The Fabulous Thirties: Italian cinema 1929-1944. Electa International, 1979.

External links

1960 films
1960 comedy films
1960s historical comedy films
Italian historical comedy films
1960s Italian-language films
Italian black-and-white films
Films directed by Mario Mattoli
Films set in Rome
Films set in 1900
Films scored by Gianni Ferrio
1960s Italian films